Howard K. Elcock (5 December 1886 – 4 March 1952) was a British painter. His work was part of the painting event in the art competition at the 1932 Summer Olympics.

References

1886 births
1952 deaths
20th-century British painters
British male painters
Olympic competitors in art competitions
Artists from Glasgow
19th-century British male artists
20th-century British male artists